Semyon Gennadyevich Shestilovsky (born 30 May 1994) is a Belarusian professional footballer who plays for Shakhtyor Soligorsk.

Honours
Belarusian Super Cup winner: 2023

References

External links
 
 
 Profile at Gorodeya website

1994 births
Living people
People from Dzyarzhynsk District
Sportspeople from Minsk Region
Belarusian footballers
Association football defenders
FC Dinamo Minsk players
FC Bereza-2010 players
FC Gorodeya players
FC Slavia Mozyr players
FC Shakhtyor Soligorsk players